Irina Yuryevna Laricheva (19 November 1964 – 29 January 2020) was a Russian trap shooter. She competed at the 2004 and 2008 Summer Olympics and finished in 13th and 9th place, respectively. She won multiple medals at the world championships in the individual and team trap, double trap and shotgun events. At European trap championships, she won a gold medal in the team competition in 1997, an individual gold medal in 1999, and two individual bronze medals in 1998 and 2000. She graduated from a Moscow medical school and lived in Moscow. She was married and has a son, Stanislav, and a daughter Olesya.

References

1964 births
2020 deaths
Olympic shooters of Russia
Shooters at the 2004 Summer Olympics
Shooters at the 2008 Summer Olympics
Russian female sport shooters
Soviet female sport shooters